The Bavarian School of Public Policy (German: Hochschule für Politik München) is an independent institution for political science within the Technical University of Munich.

Notable alumni 

 Hans Henning Atrott (born 1944), German author and theorist
 Dorothee Bär (* 1978), politician (CSU)
 Markus Blume (* 1975), politician (CSU)
 Géza Andreas von Geyr (born 1962), Vice-President of the Bundesnachrichtendienst
 Karl-Theodor zu Guttenberg (born 1971), former German Minister of Defence (2009–2011)
 Klaus Höchstetter (* 1964), expert in economics
 Katharina Holzinger, Prorektor of the University of Konstanz
 Franz Kohout (* 1953), Professor of political science
 Harry Luck (* 1972), journalist
 Franz Maget (born 1953), Chairman of the SPD Parliamentary Group in the  Landtag of Bavaria
 Otto-Peter Obermeier (* 1941), Publisher of the journal "the blue rider - journal for philosophy"
 Michael Piazolo (* 1959), political scientist
 Gerhard Polt, (born 1942), actor and cabaret artist
 Ralph Rotte (* 1968), Professor at the RWTH Aachen
 Sascha Spoun (born 1969), President of the University of Lüneburg
 Christiane Stenger (* 1987), author and presenter
 Edmund Stoiber (born 1941), former Minister-President of Bavaria (1993–2007)

References

Political science in Germany
Political science education
Technical University of Munich
1950 establishments in Germany
Educational institutions established in 1950
Universities and colleges in Munich